Percy Celso Olivares Polanco (born 5 June 1968) is a Peruvian former professional footballer who played as a left-back.

He is the father of footballer Christopher Olivares.

Club career
Born in Lima, Olivares started playing professionally with hometown's Sporting Cristal, moving to Deportivo Cali in Colombia in 1991 but returning to his first club shortly after. In August 1992 he joined 1. FC Nürnberg in the Bundesliga, appearing in slightly more of the league's matches but scoring four goals in five games in October/November 1992 – three of those in 2–1 wins – as the Bavarian club barely retained its division status, finishing in 13th position but only two points clear of the relegation zone.

Subsequently, Olivares signed for CD Tenerife in Spain, being sparingly used in two-and-a-half La Liga seasons (no games whatsoever in his last, with the Canary Islands team qualifying for the UEFA Cup) and partnering compatriot José del Solar. In January 1996 he left for Rosario Central in Argentina, representing in quick succession Fluminense FC and Cruz Azul.

Olivares moved teams and countries again in the 1997 summer, spending the following four seasons in Greece, with PAOK FC and Panathinaikos FC. On 21 November 1999, while playing for the latter, he scored against Olympiacos F.C. in a local derby, the first win for the club in three years, but failed to win any silverware during his spell in the country.

After a stint in the United States, Olivares returned to Peru, where he represented first club Sporting Cristal and Alianza Atlético. He retired from the game at 37, making a short comeback two years later with FC Thun in Switzerland.

International career
Olivares obtained 83 international caps for Peru, scoring once. He made his debut on 19 June 1987 against Chile (1–3), and played his last international match on 2 June 2001, against Ecuador (1–2), three days before his 33rd birthday.

Olivares represented the nation in seven Copa América tournaments, helping it to the quarterfinals in the 1993 edition in Ecuador. Additionally, he played in 31 FIFA World Cup qualifying matches.

References

External links

1968 births
Living people
Footballers from Lima
Peruvian footballers
Association football defenders
Peruvian Primera División players
Sporting Cristal footballers
Categoría Primera A players
Deportivo Cali footballers
Club Universitario de Deportes footballers
Alianza Atlético footballers
Bundesliga players
1. FC Nürnberg players
La Liga players
CD Tenerife players
Argentine Primera División players
Rosario Central footballers
Fluminense FC players
Liga MX players
Cruz Azul footballers
Super League Greece players
PAOK FC players
Panathinaikos F.C. players
Major League Soccer players
FC Dallas players
Peru international footballers
1987 Copa América players
1989 Copa América players
1991 Copa América players
1993 Copa América players
1995 Copa América players
1997 Copa América players
1999 Copa América players
Peruvian expatriate footballers
Expatriate footballers in Colombia
Expatriate footballers in Germany
Expatriate footballers in Spain
Expatriate footballers in Argentina
Expatriate footballers in Brazil
Expatriate footballers in Mexico
Expatriate footballers in Greece
Expatriate soccer players in the United States
Peruvian expatriate sportspeople in Spain
Peruvian expatriate sportspeople in Brazil
Peruvian expatriate sportspeople in Greece